Hans Hoffmeister (3 February 1936 – 26 September 2016) was a German water polo player. He competed at the 1960 Summer Olympics, the 1968 Summer Olympics and the 1972 Summer Olympics.

See also
 Germany men's Olympic water polo team records and statistics
 List of men's Olympic water polo tournament goalkeepers

References

External links
 

1936 births
2016 deaths
Sportspeople from Chemnitz
German male water polo players
Water polo goalkeepers
Olympic water polo players of the United Team of Germany
Olympic water polo players of West Germany
Water polo players at the 1960 Summer Olympics
Water polo players at the 1968 Summer Olympics
Water polo players at the 1972 Summer Olympics